Bir Mourad Raïs (Arabic:  بئر مراد رايس ; formerly (French: Birmendreis) is a town in Algiers Province, Algeria. The town is named in honor of the famous Ottoman admiral Murat Raïs. It is the birthplace of French Marxist philosopher Louis Althusser. , its population was 45,345.

Notable people

References

Communes of Algiers Province